East Haddam is a town in Middlesex County, Connecticut. The population was 8,875 at the time of the 2020 census.

History

Until 1650, the area of East Haddam was inhabited by at least three Indigenous peoples: the Wangunk, the Mohegan and the Niantic. The Indigenous nations called the area "Machimoodus", the place of noises, because of numerous earthquakes that were recorded between 1638 and 1899. Loud rumblings, the "Moodus Noises", could be heard for miles surrounding the epicenter of the quakes near Mt. Tom. The land, which is now Haddam and East Haddam, was purchased by settlers from the natives in 1662 for thirty coats, worth about $100.

Layout of the highways began in 1669 with Creek Row about ¼ mile east of the River and Town Street “The Great Highway” about ¼ mile east of Creek Row.  The first permanent settlers established homesteads along Creek Row in 1685. By 1700, there were thirty families living in East Haddam. Agricultural and timber farming, shipbuilding, tanneries and blacksmiths were among the early commerce. Captain John Chapman began ferry service across the Connecticut River in 1695, which ended with the completion of the swing bridge in 1913.

East Haddam was incorporated as a separate town from Haddam in 1734. By 1756, there were nearly 2,000 residents, with the Millington District as the most populated. Growth of commerce brought a surge in population to around 3,000 people by the mid-1800s. In the nineteenth century, Moodus was the “Twine Capital of America,” with twelve mills in operation. Visitors and residents such as actor William Gillette whose castle home was completed in 1914, were drawn to the area known for its rural charm and natural scenery. The growth of the resort areas of Lake Hayward, Bashan Lake and Moodus Reservoir began in the early 1900s and was a booming business for the next fifty years.

Lake Hayward is a small private lake community within East Haddam that is home to around 120 families, most living at the lake only during summer months. The community hosts several events for residents, including game nights, bingo, child activities, and live music.

Geography

Principal communities
Bashan
East Haddam Center
Hadlyme
Leesville
Little Haddam
Millington
Moodus
North Plain

Demographics

As of the census of 2000, there were 8,333 people, 3,174 households, and 2,285 families residing in the town. The racial makeup of the town was 97.26% White, 0.84% African American, 0.28% Native American, 0.40% Asian, 0.46% from other races, and 0.77% from two or more races. Hispanic or Latino of any race were 0.98% of the population.

There were 3,174 households, out of which 35.2% had children under the age of 18 living with them, 62.3% were married couples living together, 6.9% had a female householder with no husband present, and 28.0% were non-families. 21.4% of all households were made up of individuals, and 8.1% had someone living alone who was 65 years of age or older.  The average household size was 2.58 and the average family size was 3.02.

In the town, the population was spread out, with 25.5% under the age of 18, 4.8% from 18 to 24, 33.3% from 25 to 44, 25.8% from 45 to 64, and 10.6% who were 65 years of age or older.  The median age was 38 years. For every 100 females, there were 100.1 males.  For every 100 females age 18 and over, there were 96.2 males.

The median income for a household in the town was $62,304, and the median income for a family was $70,091. Males had a median income of $45,500 versus $36,055 for females. The per capita income for the town was $28,112.  About 1.0% of families and 2.9% of the population were below the poverty line, including 1.5% of those under age 18 and 1.5% of those age 65 or over. 2017 CERT Town Profile, click here.

Education

Public

The East Haddam Public School System has about 1,100 students in grades Pre-K–12; about 121 certified teachers, 70 support staff and 7 administrators. Mr. Brian Reas is superintendent of schools.
Located in Moodus, Connecticut, the three schools in the public school system are:
 Nathan Hale-Ray High School (grades 9–12) – about 418 students
 Nathan Hale-Ray Middle School (Grades 4–8) – about 573 students
 East Haddam Elementary School (Grades Pre-K–3) – about 430 students

Private

 Franklin Academy – "A Boarding and Day School for Students with Nonverbal Learning Differences in grades 8–12", according to the school's Web site.

Attractions

Cultural

East Haddam Libraries – two public libraries, The East Haddam Free Public Library] (18 Plains Rd, Moodus) and The Rathbun Free Memorial Library (36 Main St, East Haddam). EHFPL is well known for its teen and family programs, while Rathbun Library is known for its adult and child programs. Both have special collections in addition to offering basic library fare
Gillette Castle State Park – historic former home of late actor William Gillette and river outlook on Route 82.
Goodspeed Opera House – award-winning theater, on Route 82 near the East Haddam Bridge.
Venture Smith Day – annual celebration at First Church Cemetery honoring Venture Smith, East Haddam resident and author of early slave narrative

Historical

Amasa Day House – historic museum, on Plains Road
Boardman House Inn – built in 1860 as the home of Luther Boardman, now a luxury inn
East Haddam Bridge – built in 1913, the 899-foot-long swing bridge is reputed to be the longest of its type in the world
 East Haddam Historical Society Museum – includes local history exhibits, including pictures of the construction of the East Haddam Swing Bridge.
 First Church of Christ – Congregational Church built in 1794, on Town Street.
Gelston House – built in 1736, once a tavern and boarding house, now a restaurant and bar adjacent from the Goodspeed Opera House. 
Gideon Higgins house – site on the Underground Railroad, on Route 149.
Johnsonville Village – once a thriving mill community, then a Victorian Era tourist attraction, then an abandoned ghost town, now owned by Iglesia ni Cristo.
Nathan Hale School House – historic site, on Route 149, one of two Nathan Hale School Houses in Connecticut.
St. Stephen's Bell – thought to be the oldest bell in the New World, it was cast in a Spanish monastery in 815 CE and brought to the US in 1834. It now hangs at St. Stephen's Episcopal Church on Route 149.
Venture Smith's Grave – a site on the Connecticut Freedom Trail.

Natural
 Devil's Hopyard State Park, natural area with hiking trails, picnic areas, campground, and Chapman's Falls.
 Eagle viewing sites:
 Along the Connecticut River at the Town Office parking lot
 Near Riverhouse, overlooking the north side of the East Haddam Bridge
Originally called Long Pond.
Machimoodus State Park
Sunrise Resort State Park

Notable people

 Morgan Bulkeley (1837–1922), Baseball Hall of Fame inductee and first president of the National League
 George Comer (1858–1937), polar explorer and whaler; namesake of Gallinula comeri 
 Christopher Dodd, a former United States senator for Connecticut
 John Gardner Griffin, Wisconsin state assemblyman
 Bill Griffith (born 1944), cartoonist
 Louis P. Harvey (1820–1862), seventh governor of Wisconsin
 Uriel Holmes (1764–1827), United States representative from Connecticut
 Elizabeth Louisa Foster Mather (1815–1882), writer
 George White Pratt, Wisconsin state senator
 Joseph Spencer, lawyer, soldier, and statesman during the Revolutionary War
 Calvin Willey, United States senator and chair of the Senate Agriculture Committee

References

External links

Town of East Haddam Official Site
East Haddam Public Schools

 
Towns in Middlesex County, Connecticut
Connecticut populated places on the Connecticut River
Towns in Connecticut
Greater Hartford